Edrian Paul Celestino (born April 7, 1998) is a Filipino-Canadian figure skater. He is the 2019 Philippine national champion, and qualified to the free skating at the 2020 Four Continents Championships. For Canada, he is the 2016 Autumn Classic International junior champion and a two-time Canadian junior national medalist (2015–16).

Personal life 
Celestino was born in Montreal, Quebec, on April 7, 1998. He is a model for Canadian streetwear brand Hypewearnation. Celestino's skating idols are Daisuke Takahashi, Patrick Chan, and Yuzuru Hanyu.

Career 
Celestino began skating in 2002. He competed for his native Canada until the 2017–18 season before switching to representing the Philippines in the following season. Celestino was also an ice dancer.

For Canada, Celestino competed on the ISU Junior Grand Prix three times, with his highest finish being ninth at 2016 JGP Russia. He is the 2016 Autumn Classic International junior champion after previously finishing fourth in 2015. Celestino is the 2014 Canadian novice national silver medalist, the 2015 Canadian junior national bronze medalist, and the 2016 Canadian junior national silver medalist. At the senior level, he finished 12th in 2017 and 18th in 2018.

2018–2019 season 
Celestino won the national title at the 2019 Philippine Championships by over 30 points ahead of Christopher Caluza and Yamato Rowe. He did not compete internationally during the season.

2019–2020 season 
Celestino debuted for the Philippines and competed internationally for the first time since the 2016–17 season by competing at three Challenger Series events. He finished eighth at the 2019 CS Ice Star and ninth at the 2019 CS Finlandia Trophy and the 2019 CS Autumn Classic International. In November 2019, Celestino finished fourth at the 2019 Southeast Asian Games, after placing third in the short program and fourth in the free skating. Despite being nervous for the competition, he told media that he found inspiration "from within [himself] and sheer love and passion for skating."

Celestino qualified to the free skating segment at the 2020 Four Continents Championships, finishing 20th overall. He failed to attain the minimum technical element scores required to compete at the 2020 World Championships in his hometown of Montreal. Celestino would have ended his season at the 2020 Philippine Championships in April; however, the competition was postponed indefinitely due to the COVID-19 pandemic in the Philippines.

2021–2022 season 
Celestino was chosen by the Philippine Skating Union over Christopher Caluza and Michael Christian Martinez, based on the results of the federation's Olympic Qualifier Evaluation, to represent the country at the 2021 CS Nebelhorn Trophy to attempt to qualify a spot for the Philippines at the 2022 Winter Olympics. He placed eighteenth, insufficient to earn a spot. He was later twenty-second at the 2022 CS Warsaw Cup.

2022–2023 season 
Celestino competed at two Challenger events, finishing sixteenth at the 2022 CS Ice Challenge and tenth at the 2022 CS Golden Spin of Zagreb. At the 2023 Four Continents Championships, he came seventeenth.

Programs

Competitive highlights 
CS: Challenger Series; JGP: Junior Grand Prix.

For the Philippines

For Canada

Detailed results

For the Philippines

For Canada

References

External links 
 
 

1998 births
Living people
Filipino male single skaters
Canadian male single skaters
Figure skaters from Montreal
Canadian sportspeople of Filipino descent
Competitors at the 2019 Southeast Asian Games
Southeast Asian Games competitors for the Philippines